Lake Murphysboro State Park is an Illinois state park on  in Jackson County, Illinois, United States.

References

State parks of Illinois
Protected areas of Jackson County, Illinois
Murphysboro, Lake
Protected areas established in 1948
1948 establishments in Illinois